Coxsackie Creek is a  tributary to the Hudson River in the towns of Coxsackie and New Baltimore, New York in the United States.

Tributaries 
 Sickles Creek
 Coxsackie Reservoir
 Broncks Lake, in the hills above Bronck House

References 

Rivers of Greene County, New York
Rivers of New York (state)
Tributaries of the Hudson River